Smolenets is the name of several rural localities (villages and logging depot settlements) in Russia:
Smolenets, Arkhangelsk Oblast, a village in Leshukonsky Selsoviet of Leshukonsky District of Arkhangelsk Oblast
Smolenets, Leningrad Oblast, a logging depot settlement in Tikhvinskoye Settlement Municipal Formation of Tikhvinsky District, Leningrad Oblast
Smolenets, Pskov Oblast, a village in Porkhovsky District of Pskov Oblast